Ulisses Manuel Nogueira Morais (born 22 November 1959) is a Portuguese former footballer who played as a forward, currently a manager.

Playing career
Born in the village of Almoster, Santarém, Morais played for 18 years as a senior but only eight at the professional level. He represented S.C. Covilhã, GD Bragança, U.D. Guarda, Sport Benfica e Castelo Branco, Varzim S.C. and G.D. Peniche in the second division, and O Elvas C.A.D. in the Primeira Liga.

With the latter club, Morais appeared in three games in the 1987–88 season as they finished in 15th position out of 20 teams but still suffered relegation. He retired in late 1995, at the age of 36.

Coaching career
Morais started working as a manager a year after retiring, his first eight years being spent in the third division or lower. From 2002 to 2004, he led G.D. Estoril Praia to two consecutive promotions all the way to the top flight; after the latter conquest, he completed his UEFA coaching degree, level III.

From there onwards, Morais coached solely in the top tier, with Gil Vicente FC, C.S. Marítimo, Associação Naval 1º de Maio, F.C. Paços de Ferreira, Académica de Coimbra and S.C. Beira-Mar. He was dismissed by the third club on 7 September 2009 due to poor results, and only suffered relegation with the first due to irregularities, as he led Gil to the 12th place in the 2005–06 campaign.

On 5 September 2015, Morais dropped down to division two for the first time in over a decade, taking over C.D. Aves on a two-year deal after a poor start under Abel Xavier left the team second-bottom. After an eighth-place finish, he was let go of with a year remaining. He signed for F.C. Famalicão at the same level days later, and quit on 11 October 2016 with the side in 18th, taking nine points from ten games.

Morais moved abroad for the first time in June 2017, succeeding Benjamin Mora at the helm of Malaysian champions Johor Darul Ta'zim FC. After winning the Super League, Cup and Charity Shield, he left on 26 February 2018 due to a family health emergency.

Managerial statistics

References

External links

1959 births
Living people
People from Santarém, Portugal
Portuguese footballers
Association football forwards
Primeira Liga players
Liga Portugal 2 players
Segunda Divisão players
União Montemor players
S.C. Covilhã players
GD Bragança players
U.F.C.I. Tomar players
Sport Benfica e Castelo Branco players
Ermesinde S.C. players
O Elvas C.A.D. players
Varzim S.C. players
G.D. Peniche players
U.R. Mirense players
Portuguese football managers
Primeira Liga managers
Liga Portugal 2 managers
Associação Naval 1º de Maio managers
S.C. Dragões Sandinenses managers
G.D. Estoril Praia managers
Gil Vicente F.C. managers
C.S. Marítimo managers
F.C. Paços de Ferreira managers
Associação Académica de Coimbra – O.A.F. managers
S.C. Beira-Mar managers
F.C. Famalicão managers
Malaysia Super League managers
Portuguese expatriate football managers
Expatriate football managers in Malaysia
Portuguese expatriate sportspeople in Malaysia
Sportspeople from Santarém District